Eparchy of Vinnytsia and Bar is an eparchy (diocese) of the Orthodox Church of Ukraine centered in Vinnytsia. It unites parishes of Vinnytsia Oblast that have moved from the UOC (MP)

The seat of Eparchy is in the Transfiguration Cathedral in Vinnytsia.

History
The Eparchy of Vinnytsia and Bar, Ukraine emerged on 14 December 2018 after the Unification Council as a result of the transfer of Symeon (Shostatsky) under the jurisdiction of the Orthodox Church of Ukraine and the communities of the cathedral of this diocese.  The charter of the eparch administration was registered by the Ministry of Culture and Information Policy on 15 March 2019.

According to the information provided in January 2021 by Metropolitan Simeon, out of about 320 parishes he headed before moving to the OCU of the Vinnytsia and Bar, Ukraine eparchy of the UOC (MP), 51 parishes, as well as some parishes of the neighboring eparchies of Tulchyn and Mohyliv-Podilskyi, moved to the Vinnytsia eparchy of the OCU.

References

External links
 Official website

Orthodox Church of Ukraine
Eastern Orthodox dioceses in Ukraine